Elongation factor Ts, mitochondrial is a protein that in humans is encoded by the TSFM gene. It is an EF-Ts homolog.

References

Further reading

External links